Sargavasantham is an Indian Malayalam film directed by Anil Das. It was the directorial debut of Anil Das who later did the science fiction film Bharathan Effect in 2007.

Plot
The film portrays a superstitious Hindu family.

Cast
 Chippy as Abhirami
 Siddique as Roy
 Narendra Prasad as Dr. Sarathchandra Varma
 Baiju as Chandran
 Vanitha Krishnachandran
 Babu Namboothiri
 Jagathy Sreekumar as Kunjunni
 Jose Pellissery
 Rizabawa
 Seetha as Sathi
 Sudheer
 Zainuddin
 T. R. Omana
 Shammi Thilakan
 Manju Satheesh
 Gayathri Varsha

Credits
 Story: Kakkanadan (originally published as Vadakku Ninnum Vanna Pakshi)
 Screenplay, Dialogues:  Babu Pallassery
 Direction: Anil Das
 Producer: Rasheed Kattungal
 Cinematography: Ramachandra Babu
 Editing: K. Rajagopal
 Banner: Kattungal Films
 Distribution: Naaz Release
 Art Direction: Mani Suchitra
 Music: Ouseppachan
 Lyrics: Kaithapram
 Music label: Magnasound
 Effects: Murukesh
 PRO: Abraham Lincoln
 Ads: Saboo Colonia
 Associate Director: Lal Jose

External links
 
 Sargavasantham at the Malayalam Movie Database

1990s Malayalam-language films
Films scored by Ouseppachan
1995 directorial debut films
1995 films